Sierra de San Carlos, also known as the Sierra Chiquita, is an isolated mountain range in the state of Tamaulipas, Mexico. The climate is semi-arid.

Geography

It covers a total area of 896 square miles (2,320 km2). The Sierra is located between 24 and 25 north latitude and 98 30 and 99 10 west longitude.

No major highways or rivers cross the Sierra, nor are there any large towns or cities. The population is rural or resides in small villages.

Flora and fauna
Five types of vegetation cover have been identified in the Sierra. Desert thorn shrub (Tamaulipan matorral) is the most common vegetation in northeastern Mexico and covers the driest areas in the Sierra up to 1,600 feet (300 to 500 m) in elevation. About 13 percent of the total area consists of oak and oak-pine forests. 

A small amount of riparian forest mixed with tall grasses is found along streams and near reservoirs. The riparian forests feature species such as hickory (Carya palmeri) more characteristic of the United States than Mexico. Most of the forests in the Sierra are intact, as they are not of sufficient quality to encourage commercial timber harvesting.

Climate

The Sierra de San Carlos has a semi-arid climate with hot summers and mild winters. Precipitation in the Sierra averages about  annually. Most precipitation is in the summer between May and October, although winters are not as dry as in much of Mexico. The climate of the hamlet of San Nicolás is typical of the higher and cooler elevations in the Sierra. The climatic classification of the higher elevations of the Sierra de San Carlos is Cfa (sub-tropical, humid, hot summers) under the Kőppen Classification system or Crhl under the Trewartha climate classification system. Lower elevations would be BSh (Semi-arid steppe with hot summers).

References

Mountain ranges of Mexico
Landforms of Tamaulipas